A depside is a type of polyphenolic compound composed of two or more monocyclic aromatic units linked by an ester group. Depsides are most often found in lichens, but have also been isolated from higher plants, including species of the Ericaceae, Lamiaceae, Papaveraceae and Myrtaceae.

Certain depsides have antibiotic, anti-HIV, antioxidant, and anti-proliferative activity in vitro. As inhibitors of prostaglandin synthesis and leukotriene B4 biosynthesis, some depsides have in vitro anti-inflammatory activity.

A depsidase is a type of enzyme that cuts depside bonds. One such enzyme is tannase.

Examples
Gyrophoric acid, found in the lichen Cryptothecia rubrocincta, is a depside.  Merochlorophaeic acid, isolated from lichens of the genus Cladonia, is an inhibitor of prostaglandin synthesis.

Some depsides are described as anti-HIV.

See also
Salsalate homodimer formed from self-condensation of salicylic acid to form ester linkage.

References

Polyphenols
Carboxylate esters